Mary Elizabeth Gibbs (née Waine, 10 January 1836 – 21 October 1920) was a New Zealand homemaker and community leader. She was born in Aldsworth, Gloucestershire, England on 10 January 1836.

Gibbs and her family were passengers on board the Queen Bee when it struck Farewell Spit on 6 August 1877 at about midnight.

She died in Nelson in 1920 and was buried in Wakapuaka Cemetery.

References

1836 births
1920 deaths
People from Cotswold District
English emigrants to New Zealand
Burials at Wakapuaka Cemetery
19th-century New Zealand people